Kumru is a town and district of Ordu Province in the Black Sea region of Turkey. According to the 2000 census, population of the district is 44,307 of which 18,057 live in the town of Kumru.

Geography

Kumru is a small, remote town sandwiched between two mountains, 33 km inland from the Black Sea coast. Kumru is located approximately thirty-five kilometers southwest of Fatsa. The distance to Ordu is seventy kilometers. It borders four cities and towns: Korgan, Akkus, Fatsa, Unye, and Niksar.  Ortaca which is locally known as Gebekse meaning Gebe Kilise is a village of Kumru. Ortaçokdeğirmen which got its name from the mills built on the rivers is another village of Kumru. It is located on the sides of Canik mountains and about 15 minutes to Ericek plateau where the most delicious mountain strawberry is naturally grown. It is possible to see 23 shades of green around Kumru and it is almost impossible to see the brown color of earth due to the vast forests.

Notes

References

External links
 District municipality's official website 
 Kumru State Hospital 
 Road map of Kumru and environs
 Various images of Kumru, Ordu
 Kumru news portal 
 Kumru news website 

Populated places in Ordu Province
Districts of Ordu Province
Towns in Turkey